Sirio has been borne by at least three ships of the Italian Navy and may refer to:

 , a  launched in 1905 and discarded in 1923.
 , a  launched in 1935 and stricken in 1959.
 , a  launched in 2002.

Italian Navy ship names